The  Suda Bay War Cemetery is a military cemetery administered by the Commonwealth War Graves Commission at Souda Bay, Crete, Greece. It contains 19 burials from World War I and 731 World War II burials where the body was identified along with another 776 burials of bodies unable to be identified (Battle of Crete). It was designed by architect Louis de Soissons.

Among those buried there are John Pendlebury (1904–1941) and Dudley Perkins (1915–1944).

External links

 Suda Bay War Cemetery Commonwealth War Graves Commission
 

Commonwealth War Graves Commission cemeteries in Greece
Souda Bay
Buildings and structures in Chania (regional unit)
Cemeteries in Greece
World War II memorials in Greece